Robert Arugay Empedrad (born February 3, 1964) is a retired Philippine Navy admiral who served as the Administrator of the Maritime Industry Authority (MARINA) under the Duterte administration. He previously served as the Flag Officer-in-Command of the Philippine Navy from 2017 to 2020. He is a graduate of the Philippine Military Academy "Sinagtala" Class of 1986.

Education and career
Robert Empedrad first studied at Tuguegarao North Central School, and at Cagayan National High School. He also studied Civil Engineering at ) in Baguio and applied in the Philippine Military Academy in 1982, and graduated in 1986. He also earned a Master in Business Administration, at the Philippine Christian University, Dasmariñas, Cavite, and took the US Naval Staff Course at US Naval War College, in Newport, Rhode Island, as well as took the Senior Executive Course for National University and Senior Strategic Leadership Programme at the Defence Academy of the United Kingdom. He also took up various courses such as the International Riverine and Coastal Operations at Naval Amphibious Base Coronado at San Diego, California; the Instructor’s Training Course at Naval Special Warfare Center in Coronado, California; the Hermeneutics and Bible Study Course and the Christian Teachers Training Course, both in Las Piñas City.

He also commanded the Naval Task Force Sea Hawk, where he led operations against smugglers with the assistance of the Bureau of Fisheries and Aquatic Resources of the Department of Agriculture. He also led humanitarian operations during Tropical Storm Washi and Typhoon Bopha.

He also commanded various positions in the Philippine Navy such as, Chief of Staff of Naval Forces Eastern Mindanao (2006–2007), Director, Naval Operations Center (2007), Assistant Chief of Naval Staff for Intelligence, N2 (2007–2009), Deputy Commander of Naval Intelligence Security Force (2009), Assistant Chief of Naval Staff for Personnel, N1 (2009–2011), Deputy Commander of Naval Forces Eastern Mindanao (2011–2013), Commander, Bonifacio Naval Station (2013–2015), the Commander, Offshore Combat Force, Philippine Fleet (Feb 2015 – Dec 2016), the Deputy, Commander Philippine Fleet (Dec 2016 –Feb 2017) and the Deputy Chief of Staff for Reservist and Retirees Affairs, J9 at General Headquarters and Headquarters Service Command (GHQ & HSC). As well as the Chairman of Defense Acquisition System Assessment Team (DASAT), in charge of the updates on Navy Ships and the Frigate Acquisition Project, which came to a controversy that replaced his predecessor Vice Admiral Ronald Joseph Mercado for alleged insubordination over the controversy regarding the Jose Rizal-class frigates.

As Philippine Navy chief, he redesignated and downgraded the roles of the Navy's ships in order to prepare for the navy's modernization, as the navy awaits the delivery of the upcoming ships and retired 4 vintage ships: the BRP Rajah Humabon (PS-11), the BRP Sultan Kudarat (PS-22), BRP Cebu (PS-28), and the BRP Quezon (PS-70), along with two gunboats: the BRP Bienvenido Salting (PC-112), and the BRP Nicolas Mahusay (PC-119), which drew criticisms, due to the decreasing number of ships being used and being retired, despite having only a token of ships to fulfill the navy's mandate. During his term, the navy succeeded in acquiring the BRP Conrado Yap (PS-39), 6 units the Multipurpose Assault Craft MK. 3 equipped with Spike MLS ER Launchers and Mini-Typhoon Weapon Stations, 8 units of the KAAV7A1 Assault Amphibious Vehicles, 5 TC-90 patrol aircraft, and 43 new vehicles. He also oversaw the donation of 4 Type 966Y class patrol boats from China. He also led overall naval operations during the 2020 Taal Volcano Eruption. He retired from military service on February 3, 2020, after reaching the mandatory military age of 56, and was replaced by then-Commander of the Philippine Fleet, Rear Admiral Giovanni Bacordo. He was appointed by President Rodrigo Duterte as the new administrator of the Maritime Industry Authority on March 2, 2020.

Awards
Left Side:

Right Side:

Badges and Other Awards:
  Combat Commander's Badge (Philippines)
  Naval War College Badge
  Naval Surface Warfare Badge
 Gintong Medalya For Government Service Of The Dangal Ng Lahing Cagayano

Personal life
He is married to Blessilda Empedrad, and they have a son, Jelome.

References

1964 births
Living people
Philippine Navy personnel
People from Tuguegarao
Philippine Military Academy alumni
Saint Louis University (Philippines) alumni